Françoise Bettencourt Meyers (born 10 July 1953) is a French businesswoman, philanthropist, writer, pianist and billionaire heiress, the richest woman in the world, with an estimated net worth of US$75.3 billion as of March 2022, according to Forbes. She is the only child, heiress of Liliane Bettencourt and granddaughter of L'Oréal founder Eugène Schueller. Her mother died in September 2017, after which her fortune tripled with her investments through her family holding company, Tethys Invest, and the high valuation of L'Oréal shares on the stock exchange.

Biography
Raised to be a strict Catholic, she has written several Bible commentaries. She is the only daughter and heiress of Liliane Bettencourt. She married Jean-Pierre Meyers, the grandson of a rabbi murdered at Auschwitz, and they raised their children Jean-Victor and Nicolas as Jewish. Her marriage caused controversy because of her grandfather Eugène Schueller's trial for collaboration with the Nazi government; he was L'Oreal's founder. Bettencourt Meyers and her family still own a 33% stake in the company.

In 2008, she sued François-Marie Banier for taking money from her mother, and she started proceedings to have her mother declared mentally incompetent. The revelations in the secret recordings that she used in evidence led to the Woerth-Bettencourt scandal. 

In December 2010, Bettencourt Meyers announced that she had settled out of court with both her mother and Banier. 

Her mother died in September 2017 when her net worth was about $39.5 billion, which makes Bettencourt Meyers among the top 20 richest people in the world. 

After a fire severely damaged Notre-Dame de Paris, Bettencourt Meyers and L'Oréal pledged $226 million to repair the cathedral. 

As of January 2022, she is the richest woman in the world, with an estimated fortune of $94.9 billion, according to Bloomberg Billionaires Index.

Bibliography 
 The Greek gods. Genealogy (Les Dieux grecs. Généalogies), Paris, éd. 
 A look at the Bible (Regard sur la Bible), 5 vol., Introduction by Alain Decaux, Published, November 2008, awarded the prix des Lauriers Verts (section « Spirituality ») in 2009:
 Words and expressions originating in the Bible
 From one Testament to the other, Judaism and Catholicism
 Family Tree of Adam Eve, and the Tribes of Israel
 Animals, Plants, Measures, money, and numbers in the Bible
 Genealogic section

See also
List of female billionaires

References

1953 births
People from Neuilly-sur-Seine
L'Oréal people
20th-century French non-fiction writers
French businesspeople
french billionaires
Living people
Franchisee
Female billionaires